Fernando de Moraes Sanfelice (born 29 May 1990), known as Fernando Timbó, is a Brazilian footballer who plays as a centre-back and left-back. Have played in youth and senior career for Coritiba Foot Ball Club, Reb Bull Brazil, Austin Aztex, Ottawa Fury, Orlando City, Paysandu, Paraná Clube, Londrina and Vilafranquense.

His nickname “Timbó” comes from his hometown  in Brazil.

References

1990 births
Living people
Brazilian footballers
Sportspeople from Santa Catarina (state)
Association football defenders
Coritiba Foot Ball Club players
J. Malucelli Futebol players
Austin Aztex players
Ottawa Fury FC players
Orlando City B players
Paysandu Sport Club players
Paraná Clube players
Londrina Esporte Clube players
U.D. Vilafranquense players
North American Soccer League players
USL Championship players
Campeonato Brasileiro Série A players
Campeonato Brasileiro Série B players
Campeonato Brasileiro Série D players
Brazilian expatriate sportspeople in Canada
Brazilian expatriate sportspeople in the United States
Brazilian expatriate sportspeople in Portugal
Expatriate soccer players in the United States
Expatriate soccer players in Canada
Expatriate footballers in Portugal